Isobel Warren (born May 7, 1935) is a Canadian author and journalist.  Her journalism background is in newspapers and magazines, radio and television. She was founder of Hands Magazine, at that time Canada's only national craft publication, and served as its editor throughout the 1980s.  Assignments have included: Editor, CARP News; Producer, The Senior Report (TVO); Producer, On Top of the World (national TV series.)  She writes regularly for a variety of publications in Canada and the U.S., including the Toronto Star, Good Times, Forever Young and TravelScoop, and has appeared in the Medical Post, National Post, The Globe and Mail, Halifax Herald, The Plain Dealer (Cleveland, Ohio), the Cloverdale Reporter and the Rotarian, as well as in-flights, Atmosphere and Airborn.

She was co-founder of the Travel Media Association of Canada.   She is the author of On the go at 50 Plus, a handbook for mature travellers published in 1995, and co-author (with her husband, Milan Chvostek) of Florida, Eh?  A Canadian Guide to the Sunshine  State.   She writes a monthly travel column and many articles for the magazine Good Times, a Canadian 50-plus magazine.

She attended Ryerson Polytechnical Institute (now Toronto Metropolitan University) and the University of Montréal.

She was married to the late Canadian television producer Milan Chvostek, and is the mother of computer systems analyst Paul Chvostek and singer-songwriter Annabelle Chvostek.

References

External links
 Isobel Warren's main site
 Travel Media Association of Canada
 Good Times Magazine
 Annabelle Chvostek's site
 IT Canada's main site

Living people
Canadian columnists
Toronto Metropolitan University alumni
Canadian feminists
Canadian women journalists
Canadian women columnists
Canadian women non-fiction writers
1935 births